The President of the I Chamber of the Landtag of Saxony was the presiding officer of the upper chamber of that legislature.

References

Landtag I,Presidents
Saxony,Landtag I,Presidents